Cherdynsky (masculine), Cherdynskaya (feminine), or Cherdynskoye (neuter) may refer to:
Cherdynsky District, a district of Perm Krai, Russia
Cherdynskoye Urban Settlement, a municipal formation which the town of Cherdyn in Cherdynsky District of Perm Krai, Russia is incorporated as